This is a list of aviation-related events from 2008.

Deadliest crash
The deadliest crash of this year was Spanair Flight 5022, a McDonnell Douglas MD-80 which crashed on takeoff in Madrid, Spain on 20 August, killing 154 of the 172 people on board.

Events

January
 4 January – A Transaven Let L-410 Turbolet crashes near the Los Roques archipelago off Venezuela, killing all 14 on board.
 12 January – A Macedonian Army Mil Mi-17 helicopter crashes in thick fog southeast of Skopje, killing all 11 military personnel on board.
 13 January – Suspended under 600 brightly colored helium-filled party balloons, Brazilian priest Adelir Antonio de Carli lifts off from Ampere, Brazil, and reaches an altitude of  before landing safely at San Antonio, Argentina, after a four-hour flight.
 16 January – The Government of Serbia unsuccessfully attempts to privatize Jat Airways by offering 51% of its stock for sale. The offer later is cancelled due a lack of interested buyers.
 17 January – British Airways Flight 38, a Boeing 777-236ER with 152 people on board, lands short of the runway at London Heathrow Airport. Forty-seven people – of which nine receive medical treatment – suffer minor injuries, but there are no fatalities. The aircraft becomes the first Boeing 777 to be written off.
 19 January – A Gira Globo Aeronáutica Beechcraft B200 Super King Air on approach to Huambo Airport in Huambo, Angola, in rainy, foggy conditions crashes into a mountain near Bailundo, killing all 13 people on board.
 23 January – A Polish Air Force EADS CASA C-295M crashes near Mirosławiec, killing 20 Polish Air Force officers aboard, including Brigadier General Andrzej Andrzejewski.
 29 January – A missile strike by an American unmanned aerial vehicle in North Waziristan, Pakistan, kills 13 people. Al-Qaeda senior leader Abu Laith al-Libi is among the dead.

February
 1 February – Mauricio Delfabro wins the 1st FAI South American Gliding Championships and 55th National Gliding Championships of Argentina in Adolfo Gonzales Chaves in the mixed Open, 18m, 15m, and Standard Class, and Carlos Adrover becomes South American Club Class Champion.
 3 February – Silver State Helicopters ceases operations and enters bankruptcy. At the time of closing Silver State operated 194 helicopters from its 34 flight schools.
 8 February – Eagle Airways Flight 2279, a BAe Jetstream 32 is hijacked ten minutes after taking off from Blenheim, New Zealand by a passenger who attacked both pilots. The hijacker is eventually restrained by the co-pilot and the flight lands safely at Christchurch. All nine people on board survive the incident.
 14 February – Belavia Flight 1834, a Bombardier CRJ200, hits its left wing on the runway while taking off from Yerevan, Armenia. All 21 people on board escape the aircraft before it erupts into flames.
 21 February – Santa Bárbara Airlines Flight 518, an ATR 42-300, crashes shortly after taking off from Mérida, Venezuela, killing all 46 people on board.
 23 February – A United States Air Force B-2 Spirit bomber crashes shortly after takeoff from Andersen Air Force Base in Guam. Both pilots eject from the plane before it crashes.
 27 February – A missile hits a house near Kaloosha in South Waziristan, Pakistan, killing 12 people, many of them Islamic militants, and injuring several others. A Pakistani security official claims an American unmanned aerial vehicle operating over Afghanistan fired the missile.
 28 February – Boston-Maine Airways, operating as Pan Am Clipper Connection, ceases operations.

March
 The People's Republic of China makes the Civil Aviation Administration of China a component of the Ministry of Transport.
 16 March – Missiles reportedly fired by American unmanned aerial vehicles strike the house of a Taliban sympathizer in South Waziristan, killing at least 20 people and injuring seven, and another house nearby, killing an additional eight to ten people.
 23 March – When the fishing factory ship Alaska Ranger sinks in the Bering Sea with 47 people on board, two United States Coast Guard helicopters – an HH-60 Jayhawk from Saint Paul Island, Alaska, and an HH-65 Dolphin from the high endurance cutter  – brave snow squalls, a  wind chill,  seas, and  winds to rescue 20 of its survivors, while the fishing factory ship Alaska Warrior rescues 22 more. The U.S. Coast Guard deems the operation the largest cold-water rescue in its history.
 30 March
The EU–US Open Skies Agreement goes into effect. It allows any airline of the European Union (EU) and any airline of the United States to fly between any point in the European Union and any point in the United States. It also allows airlines of the United States to fly between points in the European Union, and airlines of the European Union to fly between the United States and non-EU countries like Switzerland.
British race car drivers Richard Lloyd and David Leslie are killed along with all of the other three people on board when a Cessna 500 Citation I Lloyd is piloting crashes into homes in a residential area of Farnborough, London shortly after takeoff from London Biggin Hill Airport.
 31 March – Aloha Airlines ceases operations and declares bankruptcy. It halts all passenger operations and transfers all of its cargo operations to Aloha Air Cargo.

April
 3 April
An Antonov An-28 operated by Blue Wing Airlines crashes near Benzdorp in Suriname. All 19 people on board are killed.
ATA Airlines ceases operations due to bankruptcy.
 5 April – Skybus Airlines ceases operations, citing the poor economy and rising fuel prices.
 8 April – An Antonov An-26 operated by the Vietnam People's Air Forces 918th Air Transport Regiment crashes near Hanoi. All five people on board die.
 15 April – Hewa Bora Airways Flight 122, a McDonnell Douglas DC-9-30 with 94 people on board, experiences an engine fire during takeoff at Goma International Airport. It overruns the runway and crashes into homes, shops, and market stalls in a residential area of Goma, killing three people on the aircraft and 37 people on the ground. Another 40 people on the aircraft and 71 people on the ground suffer injuries.
 20 April
An unarmed Georgian unmanned aerial vehicle is shot down over Abkhazia. The United Nations later agrees with Georgias claim that a Russian MiG-29 fighter shot it down, but Russia denies involvement.
 26 April – During an air show at Kindel Air Field outside Eisenach, Germany, a Zlín Z-37 Cmelak leaves the runway on takeoff and veers into a crowd of spectators, killing one person and injuring ten.
 27 April – Bankrupt Eos Airlines ceases operations.

May
 5 May – Facing dramatically increased prices for jet fuel, United Airlines becomes the first airline to charge passengers for a second checked bag; in the past, airlines had allowed passengers to check two bags at no additional charge. Other airlines soon join United in charging for a second checked bag.
 14 May – An American RQ-1 Predator unmanned aerial vehicle fires a missile at a house in Damadola, Pakistan, killing senior al-Qaeda leader Abu Sulayman Al-Jazairi and at least 15 other people.
 15 May – Aloha Air Cargo commences operations as an independent airline after Aloha Airlines has ceased operations.
 21 May – Serbian Air Force J-22 Orao attack aircraft serial number 25114 from the 241st Fighter-Bomber Aviation Squadron of the 98th Air Base crashes near Baranda, Serbia. The pilot, Major Tomas Janik, ejects before the plane crashes.
 30 May
The Convention on Cluster Munitions, which bans the use, transfer, and stockpiling of cluster bombs by signatory countries, is adopted at a meeting in Dublin. It will go into effect on 1 August 2010.
The British all-business-class airline Silverjet ceases operations. It was the last all-business-class airline in service.
TACA Flight 390, an Airbus A320-233, overruns the runway on landing at Toncontín International Airport in Tegucigalpa, Honduras, rolls onto a street, collides with several cars, and crashes into an embankment. Three people on the plane – including Nicaraguan businessman Harry Brautigam – and two on the ground die, and 65 other people suffer injuries.
 31 May – Champion Air ceases operations, citing high fuel prices and fuel inefficiency as the two main reasons it is going out of business.

June
The Spanish low-cost airlines Clickair and Vueling announce that they plan to merge.
 2 June – Aeroméxico Travel, operated by Aeroméxico , commences operations.
 5 June – United States Secretary of the Air Force Michael Wynne and Chief of Staff of the United States Air Force General T. Michael Moseley are asked for and provide their resignations because of an August 2007 nuclear weapons incident and other incidents.
 10 June – Fire engulfs Sudan Airways Flight 109, an Airbus A310-300 carrying 214 people, after it crashes and breaks apart on landing at Khartoum International Airport in Khartoum, Sudan. Thirty of those on board die, and six are unaccounted for.
 14 June – In attempt to kill Tehrik-i-Taliban Pakistan leader Baitullah Mehsud, American unmanned aerial vehicles fire three missiles at a house in Makeen, South Waziristan, missing him but killing at least one person.
 26 June – An Indonesian Air Force CASA C-212 crashes on Indonesias Mount Salak, killing all 18 people on board.

July
 3 July – Jat Airways establishes the first commercial air links between Serbia and Croatia since the outbreak of the Yugoslav Wars in 1991.
 9 July – Four Russian jet fighters fly into Georgian airspace to dissuade Georgia from flying reconnaissance flights over South Ossetia. The next day, Russian authorities release an official statement saying that the flight was made to prevent Georgia from launching an operation to free four Georgian soldiers detained by separatist forces in South Ossetia.
 11 July
United Airlines becomes the first airline to charge a fee for any checked bag, replacing the policy it placed in effect on 5 May of allowing one free checked bag and charging for a second checked bag. American Airlines begins to charge for all checked bags two days later, and other major airlines (except for Southwest Airlines) quickly follow suit. Checked baggage fees become a major source of revenue for airlines, which had faced severe economic trouble in the face of rapidly rising jet fuel prices. As recently as early May, airlines traditionally had allowed each passenger two free checked bags.
 13–19 July – The 18th FAI World Precision Flying Championship takes place in Ried im Innkreis, Austria.
 20–26 July – The 16th FAI World Rally Flying Championship takes place in Ried im Innkreis, Austria.
 28 July – A missile strike in South Waziristan, by an American unmanned aerial vehicle kills al-Qaeda chemical and biological weapons expert Midhat Mursi.

August
 8 August
In the 2008 South Ossetia War – which has broken out the previous evening – President of North Ossetia–Alania Taimuraz Mamsurov claims that he has witnessed an early-morning attack by a number of Georgian Air Force Sukhoi Su-25 ground-attack aircraft on what he describes as a humanitarian aid convoy he is accompanying from Vladikavkaz, Russia, to South Ossetia.
Later in the morning, Georgian sources report that three Russian Sukhoi Su-24 attack aircraft have dropped two bombs close to a police station near Kareli, Georgia, and that the nearby city of Gori has suffered a brief Russian air strike, with no casualties. Russian authorities reject these reports, but Russian media report that Russian Su-24 bombers and Sukhoi Su-27 fighters have gained complete control of the airspace above Tskhinvali, Georgia, during the Battle of Tskhinvali. In addition, a Russian fighter drops two bombs on Georgias Vaziani Military Base, killing three Georgian soldiers, and Russian fighters also bomb a Georgian military airfield in Marneuli, killing at least four people and wounding another five.
 9 August
In a predawn attack, Russian planes bombed the Georgian military base at Senaki, killing 13 Georgian soldiers, wounding another 13, and destroying most of the base. Later, two Russian fighters bomb Georgian artillery encampments near Gori; the Georgian government reports that 60 civilians have been killed when at least one of the bombs hits an apartment building, but the Russian military claims that three bombs hit an ammunition depot and that the façade of one of the adjacent apartment buildings has suffered damage as a result of exploding ammunition at the depot. Reportedly, Russian aircraft also bomb Poti, Georgia, and have started to bomb Georgias civilian and economic infrastructure. The Georgian government claims its forces have downed 10 Russian jets and captured three of their pilots, but the Russian General Staff confirms the loss of only two Russian jets, a Sukhoi Su-25 and a Tupolev Tu-22M.
Russia cuts off all air connections between Russia and Georgia.
Abkhazia begins aerial attacks on Georgian forces in the eastern part of the Kodori Valley.
 10 August – Georgia reports that Russian aircraft have struck Tbilisi International Airport in Tbilisi, Georgia, just a few hours before the scheduled arrival there of French Foreign Minister Bernard Kouchner. The Russian Ministry of Defence dismisses the report, as does Georgian State Minister for Reintegration Temur Iakobashvili, who says, "a factory that produces combat airplanes" was attacked rather than the airport.
11 August
Russia claims that the Russian Federation Air Force has shot down two Georgian Air Force helicopters – a Mil Mi-8 and a Mil Mi-24 – at the Georgian air base at Senaki, and confirms that Russia has lost another two Su-25 jets.
The Russian General Staff claims that eight U.S. military transport flights have moved 800 Georgian troops and 11 tons of cargo were moved from Iraq to Georgia. The Israeli newspaper Maariv reports that the United States is supplying Georgia with arms, hiring Russian-made cargo planes belonging to UTI Worldwide Inc. to transport arms and ammunition redirected from Iraq to Tbilisi, Georgia.
 12 August – The Foreign Minister of Abkhazia, Sergei Shamba, says that the Abkhazian Air Force has joined and Abkhaziam artillery in delivering missile and bomb strikes against Georgian forces in the upper part of the Kodori Gorge.
 13 August
An American unmanned aerial vehicle-launched missile strike on a compound in South Waziristan, serving as a Hezb-i-Islami training camp and headquarters kills up to 25 Islamic militants.
U.S. President George W. Bush orders U.S. military aircraft and ships to deliver humanitarian and medical supplies to Georgia. Later in the day, the first U.S. supplies arrive when a United States Air Force C-17 Globemaster III lands at Tbilisi International Airport.
President of Ukraine Viktor Yushchenko signs a decree requiring that Russia seek the permission of Ukraines armed forces at least 72 hours prior to Russian aircraft crossing the Ukrainian border.
 17 August – All five crew and passengers are killed aboard two light aircraft that collide in mid-air while on final approach to Coventry Airport in England.
 20 August
A cross-border missile strike by an American unmanned aerial vehicle flying over Afghanistan against an Islamic militant hideout in Wana, South Waziristan, kills at least eight people. 
Spanair Flight 5022, a McDonnell Douglas MD-82, crashes shortly after takeoff from Madrid Barajas Airport. Of 172 on board, just 18 survive. It is the worlds worst aviation accident in 2008 and Spains worst in 25 years.
 24 August
Iran Aseman Airlines Flight 6895 crashes upon takeoff near Manas International Airport in Bishkek, Kyrgyzstan, killing 68.
 An aircraft crashes in Guatemala, killing 10 people, including four Americans on a humanitarian mission.
 27 August – A Georgian unmanned aerial vehicle is shot down.
 28 August – Zoom Airlines ceases operations due to financial struggles.
 30 August – An American unmanned aerial vehicle-launched missile strike against a terrorist training camp in South Waziristan, kills two trainees holding Canadian passports. Another strike destroys a house in Tappi in North Waziristan, killing six and injuring eight.

September
 2 September – ExpressJet Airlines ends operations as an independent carrier.
 3 September – Helicopter-borne American special operations forces make the first known U.S. incursion into Pakistan, attacking Islamic militants in South Waziristan. Pakistani officials report that 20 Pakistanis die in the raid.
 4 September – Firing from over Afghanistan, an American unmanned aerial vehicle conducts a missile strike against an Islamic militant hideout in Char Khel in North Waziristan, Pakistan, killing four people.
 5 September – An American unmanned aerial vehicle missile strike against a group of houses in southern Afghanistan kills between six and 12 people.
 8 September
An American unmanned aerial vehicle missile strike in North Waziristan, Pakistan, kills Abu Haris, the al-Qaeda leader in Pakistan, while he is visiting the home of a Haqqani network commander.
A United States Air Force unmanned aerial vehicle targeting Jalaluddin Haqqani and his son Sirajuddin Haqqani strikes a former madrassa in Dande Darpa Khel, North Waziristan, Pakistan. They are not present, but 23 other people die.
 12 September
An American unmanned aerial vehicle conducts a missile strike against a house rented by the Al-Badr organization on the outskirts of Miranshah, North Waziristan, Pakistan, killing 12 people and injuring 14. 
The British charter airline XL Airways UK, a subsidiary of the XL Leisure Group, ceases operations with immediate effect, due to a deteriorating financial position. 90,000 Britons holidaying abroad are left stranded. It had been the 3rd largest package holiday group in the UK. XL Airways France and Germany are sold and continue operations.
 14 September – Aeroflot Flight 821, operated by Aeroflot Nord, crashes on approach to Perm Airport, killing all 82 passengers and six crew members. Following the accident and concerns about safety procedures, Aeroflot chief executive Valery Okulov announces Awefolfot will be stripping Aeroflot-Nord of the right to use the brand name Aeroflot and would be severing all ties between the companies.
 17 September – An American unmanned aerial vehicle attack in Baghar Cheena, South Waziristan, kills five Islamic militants, including al-Qaeda operative Abu Ubaidah al Tunisi.
 23 September
A Pakistani security official claims than an American unmanned aerial vehicle (UAV) has been shot down over Angoor Adda, South Waziristan, but the United States denies having lost any UAVs.
 Ten North Atlantic Treaty Organization (NATO) member countries (Bulgaria, Estonia, Hungary, Lithuania, the Netherlands, Norway, Poland, Romania, Slovenia, and the United States) and two Partnership for Peace member countries (Finland and Sweden) form the Strategic Airlift Capability consortium to pool resources in order to operate Boeing C-17 Globemaster III aircraft for joint strategic airlift purposes. The consortium will receive its first C-17 in July 2009.
 30 September
The Philippine airline Asian Spirit announces its rebranding as Zest Airways.
An American unmanned aerial vehicle strikes the house of a local Pakistani Taliban leader near Mir Ali, North Waziristan, killing at least six people and injuring up to nine.
Almaty International Airport in Almaty, Kazakhstan, opens its second runway, the longest runway in Central Asia. The first aircraft to use the new runway is a BMI airliner which takes off for a flight to Heathrow Airport in London.

October
 1 October
The Japanese Aircraft and Railway Accidents Investigation Commission merges with the Japan Marine Accident Inquiry Agency to form the Japan Transport Safety Board, which becomes responsible for investigating aviation accidents in Japan.
The United States Air Force reactivates the Seventeenth Air Force for service as a component of United States Africa Command. The Seventeenth Air Force had been inactive since September 1996.
 The wreckage of the Bellanca Super Decathlon of American aviation adventurer Steve Fossett – who had disappeared during a flight on 3 September 2007 – is discovered; his remains will be found on 29 October.
 3 October - A missile strike by an American unmanned aerial vehicle against a house in Mohammed Khel, North Waziristan, kills 21 people, many of them apparently Islamic militants.
 6 October – Sun Country Airlines files for Chapter 11 Bankruptcy Protection for a second time.
 8 October – Yeti Airlines Flight 103 crashes on final approach to Tenzing-Hillary Airport in Lukla, Nepal, killing 18 of the 19 people on board.
 9 October – A missile strike by an American unmanned aerial vehicle against a house outside Miranshah, North Waziristan, kills at least six people.
 11 October - An American unmanned aerial vehicle conducts a missile strike against a compound in North Waziristan, killing five people and injuring two.
 16 October - A missile strike by an American unmanned aerial vehicle against Taparghai, South Waziristan, kills senior al-Qaeda operative Khalid Habib and three other people.
 22 October – A suspected American unmanned aerial vehicle-launched missile strikes a village near Miranshah, Pakistan, apparently targeting Jalaluddin Haqqani misses him but kills four people.
 23 October – A missile fired by an American unmanned aerial vehicle kills seven students at a religious school in Dande Darpakhel, North Waziristan.
 24 October – United States Secretary of the Air Force Michael Donley announces the creation of the Air Force Global Strike Command as a new United States Air Force major command.
 26 October – A missile fired by an American unmanned aerial vehicle destroys a house in Mandatta, South Waziristan, owned by senior Taliban leader Mohammed Omar, killing 20 people.
 29 October
Northwest Airlines is merged into Delta Air Lines.
Peruvian Airlines begins flight operations.
 31 October
 A missile strike by one or more American unmanned aerial vehicles destroys a house in Wana, South Waziristan, killing seven people including six Islamic militants.
 Four missiles fired by American unmanned aerial vehicles kill 20 people in North Waziristan, Pakistan, including al-Qaeda operative Mohammad Hasan Khalil al-Hakim, killed in a strike on his car.

November
During the month, the International Bird Strike Committee is established to coordinate information on bird strikes among countries.
7 November – Four missiles fired by one or more American unmanned aerial vehicles strike an al-Qaeda training camp in Kumsham, North Waziristan, killing up to 14 people.
14 November – An American unmanned aerial vehicle missile strike near Miranshah, North Waziristan, kills 12 people.
19 November – Al-Qaeda operative Abdullah Azam al-Saudi is among five people killed in a missile strike by one or more American unmanned aerial vehicles in the Bannu District of Khyber Pakhtunkhwa, Pakistan.
22 November – A missile strike by an American unmanned aerial vehicle on a house in Ali Khel outside Miranshah, North Waziristan, kills al-Qaeda operatives Rashid Rauf and Abu Zubair al-Masri and three other people.
29 November – An American unmanned aerial vehicle-launched missile strike on a village near Miranshah, North Waziristan, Pakistan, kills three people.

December
 11 December – A missile fired by an American unmanned aerial vehicle strikes a house in a madrassa in Azam Warzak, South Waziristan, killing seven Islamic militants.
 15 December – A missile strike by an American unmanned aerial vehicle against a house in Tapi Tool, North Waziristan, kills two people.
 20 December – After hearing a bumping or rattling sound near the end of their takeoff roll at Denver International Airport in Denver, Colorado, the flight crew of Continental Airlines Flight 1404, a Boeing 737-524 with 115 people on board, aborts their takeoff. The plane veers off the runway and crashes. There are no fatalities, but 38 people on board are injured, two of them critically, and the aircraft is written off.
 22 December – A missile strike by an American unmanned aerial vehicle in South Waziristan kills at least eight people.

Deaths

January 
 18 January – Bertram James, 92, British veteran of the Royal Air Force who survived the "Great Escape" from Stalag Luft III.
23 January – Andrzej Andrzejewski, 46, Polish Air Force general, in the crash of an EADS CASA C-295.

February 
 11 February – Frank Piasecki, 88, creator and pilot of America's second successful helicopter, the PV-2, and creator of the tandem-rotor helicopter design.

March 
 3 March
Donald S. Lopez Sr., 84, United States Army Air Forces and United States Air Force fighter and test pilot and deputy director of the Smithsonian Institutions National Air and Space Museum.
Norman "Hurricane" Smith, 85, English musician, record producer, and audio engineer who served as a Royal Air Force glider pilot during World War II.
 6 March – Albert William Baker, 89, Canadian aviator and aeronautical engineer.
 15 March – Vicki Van Meter, 26, American pilot, youngest-pilot distance-flying record setter; committed suicide.
 20 March – Ann Baumgartner, 89, first American woman to fly a jet.
 25 March – Jimmy Dell, 83, British test pilot
 26 March – Wally Phillips, 82, World War II United States Army Air Forces veteran who later became a radio personality.

April 
 7 April – Joe Shell, 89, California politician who was a World War II United States Navy pilot.
 8 April – Diana Barnato Walker, 90, English aviator and horse rider, the first British woman to break the sound barrier.
 11 April – Harry Goonatilake, 78, Sri Lankan Air Chief Marshal, Commander of the Air Force from 1976 to 1981.

June 
 3 June – Tadeusz Kotz, 94, World War II Polish fighter ace.
 5 June – Frank Blackmore, 92, British traffic engineer who was a Royal Air Force veteran.
 8 June – Gene Damschroder, 86, American politician and World War II pilot, in a plane crash.
 16 June – Bert Shepard, 87, American Major League Baseball player who served as a World War II United States Army Air Forces fighter pilot.

July 
 23 July – Dick Johnson, 85, American glider pilot and aeronautical engineer, in a plane crash.
 28 July – Margaret Ringenberg, 87, American aviator who logged more than 40,000 hours of flight time, of natural causes.

September 
 3 September – Donald Blakeslee, 90, World War II United States Army Air Forces fighter ace.
 16 September – John Fancy, 95, British World War II Royal Air Force airman.

October 
 3 October – Edsel Dunford, 73, American aerospace engineer, of cancer.
 6 October – Richard Heyser, 81, American U-2 pilot during the 1962 Cuban Missile Crisis.

First flights

February
 6 February – Falcomposite Furio carbon-fibre kit aircraft
 19 February – Sukhoi Su-35 (NATO reporting name "Flanker-E")

March
 8 March – Cessna 162 Skycatcher (conforming prototype)

April
 29 April – Embraer Phenom 300

May
 19 May – Sukhoi Superjet 100's maiden flight.

July
 3 July – Cirrus Vision SF50's maiden flight.
30 July – Piper PA-47 PiperJet

August
 27 August – Sikorsky X2

September
3 September – Bombardier CRJ1000

November
28 November – Comac ARJ21

December
 18 December – Schweizer 434
 21 December – Scaled Composites White Knight Two

Retirements

March
 20 March – BAE Systems Phoenix UAV by the British Army.

References

 
Aviation by year